"Apparat Singles Group", a.k.a. "Apparat", is a fictional comic book line and a label used to publish four one-shot comic books created by Warren Ellis and published by Avatar Press.

Publication history
The premise behind the line was that each one-shot represented a first issue of a comic published in an alternate reality where pulp stories made a direct transition into comics without spawning superhero comics. Each one-shot came with an essay explaining the premise of the label and a detailed behind-the-scenes explanation for the ideas that led to the creation of each comic. To help maintain the premise, each one-shot had an Apparat label, with the Avatar Press label appearing only on back covers.

Titles

Angel Stomp Future 
Genre: Science Fiction

Doctor Angel Antimony takes the reader on a tour of her very weird future. Rampant body modification, black comedy and memetics fill out the pages.

Frank Ironwine 
Genre: Detective

Frank Ironwine is a middle-aged homicide detective with a low-key investigative style, focusing on character and motivation instead of forensics.

Quit City 
Genre: Aviator Adventure

The story follows a woman pilot who dropped out of the Aeropiratika group of adventurers and returned home to San Francisco, where she deals with the unfinished business from her past.

Simon Spector 
Genre: Pulp Vigilantes

Modeled after Doc Savage and The Shadow, Simon Spector is a wealthy man who apparently lives in a skyscraper in Manhattan. He has been trained to kill barehanded and makes use of drugs which make him "super-sane" with advanced cognitive abilities, at the cost of cutting his life expectancy with each dose.

Collected editions
The four one-shots have been collected into a trade paperback:

Apparat: The Singles Collection (112 pages, January 2006)

Imprint
Warren Ellis has recently announced plans to return to Apparat label to publish the original graphic novellas Crécy, Aetheric Mechanics, Frankenstein's Womb, and the ongoing monthly Doktor Sleepless.

References

External links